Metzneria ivannikovi is a moth of the family Gelechiidae. It was described by Piskunov in 1979. It was described from the Soviet Union.

References

Moths described in 1979
Metzneria